The National Security College (variously abbreviated as MBL, MABL, MBAL, MABAL), also translated as the  National Defense College is a military education institution in Israel  intended to provide education on the foundations of national security at an academic level in political and social issues. The college is intended for senior members of the all branches of the Israeli security forces.

The decision to establish the college was made by the cabinet in 1962 and it was opened in October 1963 with Colonel Uzi Narkiss as its head but in 1966 a committee was established to analyze whether the existence of the college is justified in view of the  difficult economic situation. It was decided that the college failed to efficiently address the stated goals and it was decided to close it in 1967. It was decided to reopen it in 1977.

In 1991 all military colleges, including MABAL, were merged into IDF Military Colleges under the General Staff.  

In 2006 the college started to accept student from foreign militaries. 

The College has contacts with Moscow State Institute of International Relations.

See also
Institute for National Security Studies (Israel)

References

Israel Defense Forces
Military education and training in Israel